The XIII International Chopin Piano Competition took place in Warsaw from October 1–22, 1995. As in the previous competition five years earlier, the first prize was not awarded.

Awards 
The competition consisted of three stages and a final. The first prize was not awarded. Instead, Philippe Giusiano and Alexei Sultanov shared second prize. Sultanov, considered the favourite by the public, refused his award by boycotting the prize-winners' concert.

The following prizes were awarded:

For the first and only time in the history of the competition, none of the special prizes were awarded:

Jury
  Paul Badura-Skoda (vice-chairman)
  Halina Czerny-Stefańska ( IV)
  Bella Davidovich ( IV)
  Jean-Jacques Eigeldinger
  Jan Ekier (chairman)
  Lidia Grychtołówna
  Adam Harasiewicz ( V)
  Barbara Hesse-Bukowska ( IV)
  Andrzej Jasiński
  Ivan Klánský
  
  Lee Kum-Sing
  Dominique Merlet
  Victor Merzhanov
  Ming-Qiang Li
  Hiroko Nakamura
  Piotr Paleczny (vice-chairman)
  
  Edith Picht-Axenfeld
  Bernard Ringeissen
  Harold C. Schonberg
  Regina Smendzianka
  
  Arie Vardi

Competition Results (by rounds)

First round
October 2–8.

   Irene Inzerillo
   Soojin Ahn
  Mika Akiyama
  Susumu Aoyagi
  Andrew Armstrong
  Racha Arodaky
  Angela Au
  Maurizio Baglini
  Tomasz Bartoszek
  Beata Bilinska
  Gergely Boganyi
  Anna Bogolyubova
  Jean-François Buvery
  Jan Krzysztof Broja
  Luigi Cartia
  Chang Chen
   Ruei-Bin Chen
  Ya-Fei Chuang
  Eun-Joo Chung
  Roberto Cominati
  Claudia Corona Castillo
  Michele d'Ambrosio
  Tomasz Debowski
  Jean-François Dichamp
  Mariusz Drzewicki
  Natasa Dukan
  Nami Ejiri
  Marina Evreison
  Masako Ezaki
  Michal Ferber
  Simone Ferraresi
  Massimiliano Ferrati
  Ingrid Fliter
  Marylin Frascone
  Eliska Gazdova
  Philippe Giusiano
  Nelson Goerner
  Grzegorz Gorczyca
  Ambre Lyn Hammond
  Ayako Higuchi
  Ilya Itin
  Megumi Ito
  Maria Ivanova
  Karina Jermaka
  Adam Jezierzanski
  Petr Jirikovski
  Yoshizaku Jumei
  Mario Karacic
  Masahi Katayama
  Yuko Kawai
  Igal Kesselman
  Won Kim
  Piotr Klajn
  Tomasz Kolodziejek
  Maria Kopylova
  Pawel Kubica
  Olaf John Laneri
  Javier Lanis
  Katherine Lee
  Ying-Chien Lin
  Magdalena Lisak
  Chih-Han Liu
  Anne-Louise Turgeon
  Joanna Laweynowicz
  Rafal Luszczewski
  Marlena Maciejkowicz
  Aleksandar Madžar
  Maki Maeda
  Ratimir Martinovic
  Janne Mertanen
  Zrinka Mikelic
  Oleksandr Mikhailyuk
  Misa Miyamoto
  Peter Miyamoto
  Rika Miyatani
  Daria Monastyrski
   Gabriela Montero
  Manuel Montero Contreras
  Luca Monti
  Chie Mori
  Hideki Nagano
  Hisako Nagayoshi
  Jon Nakamatsu
  Nguen Bich Tra
  Michio Nishihara Toro
  Koji Oikawa
  Masaru Okada
  Nicholas Ong
  Anthony Padilla
  Jong-Gyung Park
  Oksana Petrechenko
  Peter Petrov
  Daria Petrova
  Andrey Ponochevny
  Olga Pushetchnikova
  Zbigniew Raubo
  Eliane Reyes
  Marcela Rodríguez Hidalgo
  Michele Rovetta
  Katarzyna Rzeszutek
  Kei Saotome
  Georg Schneider
  Graham Scott
  Timur Sergeyenya
  Yuan Sheng
  Fumiko Shiraga
  Katia Skanavi
  Alex Slobodyanik
  Piotr Slopecki
  Anna Stempin
  Renata Stocko
  Constantinos Stylianou
  Shigetoshi Suematsu
  Alexei Sultanov
  Ivana Švarc
  Michal Szczepanski
  Maciej Szyrner
  Yuki Takao
  Johko Takemura
  Zhihua Tang
  Tomaz Tobing
  Igor Tsittser
  Marie Tsunoda
  Krystina Tucka
  Rem Urasin
  Junko Urayama
  Mark Vainer
  Frédéric Vaysse-Knitter
  Natasa Veljkovic
  Katarzyna Vernet
  Sana Villerusha
  Jin-Ho Weng
  Filip Wojciechowski
  Elina Yanchenko
  Libby Yu
  Lu-Hui Yu
  Elena Zaitseva
  Anna Zasimova
  Pawel Zawadzki
  Connie Ying Zhang
  Ludmila Zhilenkova

Second round
October 10–13
  Mika Akiyama
  Susumu Aoyagi
  Andrew Armstrong
  Maurizio Baglini
  Tomasz Bartoszek
  Beata Bilinska
  Gergely Boganyi
  Jan Krzysztof Broja
  Luigi Cartia
  Roberto Cominati
  Nami Ejiri
  Michal Ferber
  Massimiliano Ferrati
  Ingrid Fliter
  Marylin Frascone
  Eliska Gazdova
  Philippe Giusiano
  Nelson Goerner
  Ilya Itin
  Piotr Klajn
  Magdalena Lisak
  Chih-Han Liu
  Rika Miyatani
   Gabriela Montero
  Chie Mori
  Koji Oikawa
  Andrey Ponochevny
  Olga Pushetchnikova
  Zbigniew Raubo
  Timur Sergeyenya
  Yuan Sheng
  Katia Skanavi
  Alexei Sultanov
  Ivana Švarc
  Johko Takemura
  Rem Urasin
  Sana Villerusha
  Filip Wojciechowski
  Libby Yu
  Lu-Hui Yu
  Pawel Zawadzki

Semi-finals
October 15 and 16
  Andrew Armstrong
  Maurizio Baglini
  Luigi Cartia
  Roberto Cominati
  Nami Ejiri
  Philippe Giusiano
  Nelson Goerner
  Magdalena Lisak
  Rika Miyatani
   Gabriela Montero
  Andrey Ponochevny
  Katia Skanavi
  Alexei Sultanov
  Rem Urasin
  Libby Yu

Final
October 18 and 19
  Philippe Giusiano
  Magdalena Lisak
  Rika Miyatani
   Gabriela Montero
  Alexei Sultanov
  Rem Urasin
 No overall winner.

References 

 International Frederic Chopin Piano Competition Frédéric Chopin Society 1995 FCIC webpage.

Further reading

External links 
 

International Chopin Piano Competition
1995 in music
1995 in Poland
1995 in Polish music
1990s in Warsaw
October 1995 events in Europe